Giotto may refer to:

Giotto di Bondone (1267–1337), Italian painter
Giotto's Campanile, Florence
Giotto Bizzarrini (born 1926), Italian automobile engineer 
Giotto Griffiths (1864–1938), Welsh rugby player
Giotto (spacecraft), a European Space Agency probe that observed Halley's comet
Ferrero Giotto, a brand of round wafer-based snacks
Giotto, a Linux bootable floppy disk
Giotto (work-place integrity test), a psychological test for employers to assess personal integrity
Giotto, a fictional character in the manga and anime series Katekyō Hitman Reborn!
7367 Giotto, a main-belt asteroid
 Giotto (crater), a crater on Mercury
 Giotto is a time-triggered programming language which is included in Giotto system (a programming language, a compiler, a run time system)